In enzymology, a 1-alkenyl-2-acylglycerol choline phosphotransferase is an enzyme that catalyzes the chemical reaction

CDP-choline + 1-alkenyl-2-acylglycerol  CMP + plasmenylcholine

Thus, the two substrates of this enzyme are CDP-choline and 1-alkenyl-2-acylglycerol, whereas its two products are CMP and plasmenylcholine.

This enzyme belongs to the family of transferases, specifically those transferring non-standard substituted phosphate groups.  The systematic name of this enzyme class is CDP-choline:1-alkenyl-2-acylglycerol cholinephosphotransferase. This enzyme is also called CDP-choline-1-alkenyl-2-acyl-glycerol phosphocholinetransferase.  This enzyme participates in ether lipid metabolism.

References

 

EC 2.7.8
Enzymes of unknown structure